Kabamarg is a village in Doru Shahabad Tehsils in Anantnag district in Jammu and Kashmir. Due to the presence of a relic of Muhammad, the shrine at Kabamarg is famous in the whole valley.

Demographics
Kashmiri is the local language here. Also people speaks Hindi and Urdu .

Transport

By Rail
Sadura Railway Station and Anantnag Railway Station are the very near by railway stations to Kabamarg. However Jammu Tawi Railway Station is major railway station  243 km near to Kabamarg.

References

Villages in Anantnag district